The President of the Republic of Artsakh head of state and head of government of the de facto Republic of Artsakh.

In a constitutional referendum held in 2017, citizens of the Republic voted in favor of transforming Artsakh into a presidential system.

Former prime minister and state minister Arayik Harutyunyan is the incumbent president elected in 2020 Artsakhian general election.

Constitutional powers 
As a republic with presidential system, Artsakh grants significant power to the president who controls the executive branch, represents the country abroad and appoints the ministers. The president is also the commander-in-chief of the Artsakh Defence Army and has the right to appoint and dismiss the supreme command of the armed forces and other troops.

Article 93 of the current constitution determines the functions of the president based on which the president:

 Shall administer the domestic and foreign policies of the State;
 Shall exercise general management of the bodies of the state administration system;
 Shall define the structure and rules of operation of the Government and other state bodies ;
 Shall appoint and dismiss the state minister and ministers;
 Shall administer state property and finances;
 Shall make appointments to the state positions, in cases prescribed by law;
 May form advisory bodies;
 Shall represent the Republic of Artsakh in international relations, sign international treaties, present international agreements to the National Assembly for ratification and sign their ratification forms, approve, suspend or revoke the international agreements not requiring ratification;
 Shall appoint and recall the diplomatic representatives of the Republic of Artsakh to foreign countries and international organizations; receive the credentials and letters of recall of diplomatic representatives of foreign states and international organizations;
 May issue decree on not holding elections and referendum during martial law;
 May dissolve the National Assembly except for one-year period following the opening of the first parliamentary session, in times of war and emergency as well as when he/she, during martial law, has issued a decree on not holding elections;
 Shall apply to the President of the National Assembly with a proposal to convene a special session or sitting of the National Assembly;
 Shall submit the Draft State Budget to the National Assembly;
 Shall have the right to legislative initiative;
 Shall apply to the National Assembly with a recommendation of amnesty;
 May deliver an address to the people and the National Assembly; 
 Shall submit to the National Assembly an annual communication on the implementation progress and results of his/her Program of previous year and on the Program of following year;
 Shall propose to the National Assembly a candidate for the Prosecutor General; at the recommendation of the Prosecutor General, shall appoint and dismiss the Deputy Prosecutor Generals;
 Shall appoint one member-lawyer of the Supreme Judicial Council;
 In the event of a natural disaster or other emergency situations, shall take measures appropriate to the situation and address the people on that matter; if necessary, shall declare state of emergency;
 Shall decorate with orders and medals of the Republic of Artsakh and confere the highest military and honorary titles, the highest diplomatic and other class ranks;
 Shall decide on the issue of granting pardon to convicts under the procedure prescribed by law;
 Shall, in the cases and under the procedure prescribed by law, decide on issues in respect of granting and terminating citizenship of the Republic of Artsakh;
 Shall adopt normative and individual legal acts: such as decrees and executive orders.

Election

Requirements 
The Constitution of Artsakh requires that the president should be at least 35-years-old, being a citizen of only of the Republic of Artsakh for the preceding ten years and having resided permanently only in Artsakh at least preceding ten years.

Term limits 
The president is elected in a five-year term and can be reelected only once.

List of heads of state (1992–present)

Chairmen of the Supreme Council (1992–1994)

Presidents (1994–present)

Latest election

See also 

Prime Minister of Artsakh
President of the National Assembly of Artsakh

Note

     α.    Assassinated in the 1999 Armenian parliament shooting.

References

 
Artsakh presidents